Waitawa Regional Park is a regional park situated on the coast of Tamaki Strait, east of Auckland, New Zealand.

The park was one of Auckland's first recreational parks, designed specifically for active recreational activities such as mountain biking, horse riding, kayaking and disc golf.  One of the beaches is part of the Te Ara Moana Kayak Trail, while another will be a home base for marine education.

The land was purchased in 2004 by the former Auckland Regional Council and has been managed as a regional park by Auckland Council since 2014.

See also
Regional parks of New Zealand

References

Franklin Local Board Area
Parks in the Auckland Region
Regional parks of New Zealand
Tourist attractions in the Auckland Region
2013 establishments in New Zealand
Protected areas established in 2013